Chariesthes obscura is a species of beetle in the family Cerambycidae. It was described by Charles Joseph Gahan in 1890, originally under the genus Phymasterna. It has a wide distribution in Africa.

References

Chariesthes
Beetles described in 1890